Ambrosius Schupp also Ambrósio Schupp or Ambros Schupp (his full original German name still needs to be added here) (1840–1914) was a German-Brazilian Catholic priest, educator and author.

Schupp was born at Montabaur. As a highly educated German immigrant to Brazil, amongst his priestly activities, he authored many books, like:
A evolução e o homem, 1909
As cobras do Rio Grande do Sul, 1913
Fenômenos luminosos no mundo orgânico, 1905
Os Muckers – Episódio Histórico Ocorrido Nas Colônias Alemãs do Rio Grande do Sul, 1912, about the Revolt of the Muckers
His book about the Muckers has proven to be a particularly interesting document not only because it does convey a lot of information about the event and the main characters who played a crucial role in it, but also since it tells, perhaps even more about the pervasive attitude of his time and the local social context towards non-conforming minority religious thinking and practices.

Schupp was fluent in many languages: High German, Latin, Spanish, and the 
Riograndenser Hunsrückisch German vernacular most prominently used in the German-speaking regions of Southern Brazil. He died in Porto Alegre.

See also
German-Brazilian

References

1840 births
1914 deaths
20th-century Brazilian Roman Catholic priests
19th-century German Roman Catholic priests
German emigrants to Brazil
Rebellions in Brazil
Rio Grande do Sul
People from Westerwaldkreis